In projective geometry, a correlation is a transformation of a d-dimensional projective space that maps subspaces of dimension k to subspaces of dimension , reversing inclusion and preserving incidence. Correlations are also called reciprocities or reciprocal transformations.

In two dimensions
In the real projective plane, points and lines are dual to each other. As expressed by Coxeter,
A correlation is a point-to-line and a line-to-point transformation that preserves the relation of incidence in accordance with the principle of duality. Thus it transforms ranges into pencils, pencils into ranges, quadrangles into quadrilaterals, and so on.
Given a line m and P a point not on m, an elementary correlation is obtained as follows: for every Q on m form the line PQ. The inverse correlation starts with the pencil on P: for any line q in this pencil take the point . The composition of two correlations that share the same pencil is a perspectivity.

In three dimensions
In a 3-dimensional projective space a correlation maps a point to a plane. As stated in one textbook:
If κ is such a correlation, every point P is transformed by it into a plane , and conversely, every point P arises from a unique plane π′ by the inverse transformation κ−1.

Three-dimensional correlations also transform lines into lines, so they may be considered to be collineations of the two spaces.

In higher dimensions
In general n-dimensional projective space, a correlation takes a point to a hyperplane. This context was described by Paul Yale:
A correlation of the projective space P(V) is an inclusion-reversing permutation of the proper subspaces of P(V).

Existence of correlations
Correlations can exist only if the space is self-dual.  For dimensions 3 and higher, self-duality is easy to test: A coordinatizing skewfield exists and self-duality fails if and only if the skewfield is not isomorphic to its opposite.

Special types of correlations

Polarity
If a correlation φ is an involution (that is, two applications of the correlation equals the identity:  for all points P) then it is called a polarity. Polarities of projective spaces lead to polar spaces, which are defined by taking the collection of all subspace which are contained in their image under the polarity.

Natural correlation
There is a natural correlation induced between a projective space P(V) and its dual P(V∗) by the natural pairing  between the underlying vector spaces V and its dual V∗, where every subspace W of V∗ is mapped to its orthogonal complement W⊥ in V, defined as 

Composing this natural correlation with an isomorphism of projective spaces induced by a semilinear map produces a correlation of P(V) to itself.  In this way, every nondegenerate semilinear map  induces a correlation of a projective space to itself.

References

 
 

Projective geometry
Functions and mappings